Please don't delete this article because this actor or actress is new and will play/is playing a lead, supporting or breakthrough role in the J drama series  and will continue their career and make more roles, either lead or supporting, after the end of the programme.

  is a Japanese actor, fashion model, singer, and former member of M!LK. He is affiliated with Stardust Promotion.

Biography
At the age of 10, Mizuki was scouted by Stardust Promotion when he and his mother were on their way home from shopping. He later joined EBiDAN when he was 11. He appeared in Fujifabric music video as his debut work.

In 2014 he made his movie debut  Dark Gold Ushima-kun Part 2 。As well as getting a major role in Solomon's Perjury as Kazuhiko Kambara, which was released in 2015. In 2014, he officially became a member of M!LK formed by EBiDAN at the star festival held in November 2014 。  In November 2015 he appeared in the NHK taiga drama Hana Moyu as Mōri Motoakira.

Filmography

Movies

TV drama

Variety
Pleasant TV SKUK and Japan (October 3, 2016, Fuji Television)

Radio
M! LK's milk bottle graduated. (April 3, 2015 - September 30, 2016, Radio Japan )

Music videos

Advertisements

Dubbing
Safe House (Liam Duke (Joel MacCormack))

References

External links
 
 M!LK公式ブログ」Powered by LINE

Stardust Promotion artists
Male actors from Tokyo
2000 births
Living people

21st-century Japanese singers
21st-century Japanese male singers